The Riverside Soofie Mosque and Mausoleum is a provincial heritage site in Durban in the KwaZulu-Natal province of South Africa.

In 1980 it was described in the Government Gazette as

They are two of the holiest Moslim shrines in South Africa.

References

 South African Heritage Resource Agency database

Buildings and structures in Durban
Mosques in South Africa